Constantin Tudosie (born 23 March 1950 in Leu, Dolj) is a Romanian former handball player and World Champion who competed in the 1972 Summer Olympics and the 1976 Summer Olympics.

In 1972 he won the bronze medal with the Romanian team. He played three matches and scored three goals.

Four years later he won the silver medal as part of the Romanian team. He played all five matches and scored four goals.

Around 1978, he moved to West Germany, where he also worked as a coach.

References

External links
profile

1950 births
Living people
Romanian male handball players
CSA Steaua București (handball) players 
Handball players at the 1972 Summer Olympics
Handball players at the 1976 Summer Olympics
Olympic handball players of Romania
Olympic silver medalists for Romania
Olympic bronze medalists for Romania
Olympic medalists in handball
Romanian expatriates in Germany
Medalists at the 1976 Summer Olympics
Medalists at the 1972 Summer Olympics
People from Dolj County